Epipristis truncataria is a moth of the family Geometridae first described by Francis Walker in 1861. It is found on Borneo and Sumatra and in Singapore.

Adults are pale dull green with greyish clouding.

References

Moths described in 1861
Pseudoterpnini